Jonas Emet (born 13 February 1988 in Jakobstad) on Finnish footballer, who plays as a midfielder for FF Jaro.

Career
Throughout his career, Emet has represented FF Jaro, Tampere United, and IFK Mariehamn. He made his debut at the senior level in 2005.

International career
Emet was a member of Finland U-15, Finland U-17, Finland U-19 and Finland national under-21 football team.

Personal life
He was born in Jakobstad.

References

1988 births
Living people
People from Jakobstad
Finnish footballers
Veikkausliiga players
FF Jaro players
Association football midfielders
Tampere United players
Sportspeople from Ostrobothnia (region)
21st-century Finnish people